In geometry, the rectified 24-cell or rectified icositetrachoron is a uniform 4-dimensional polytope (or uniform 4-polytope), which is bounded by 48 cells: 24 cubes, and 24 cuboctahedra. It can be obtained by rectification of the 24-cell, reducing its octahedral cells to cubes and cuboctahedra.

E. L. Elte identified it in 1912 as a semiregular polytope, labeling it as tC24.

It can also be considered a cantellated 16-cell with the lower symmetries B4 = [3,3,4]. B4 would lead to a bicoloring of the cuboctahedral cells into 8 and 16 each. It is also called a runcicantellated demitesseract in a D4 symmetry, giving 3 colors of cells, 8 for each.

Construction 

The rectified 24-cell can be derived from the 24-cell by the process of rectification: the 24-cell is truncated at the midpoints. The vertices become cubes, while the octahedra become cuboctahedra.

Cartesian coordinates 

A rectified 24-cell having an edge length of  has vertices given by all permutations and sign permutations of the following Cartesian coordinates:
 (0,1,1,2) [4!/2!×23 = 96 vertices]

The dual configuration with edge length 2 has all coordinate and sign permutations of:
 (0,2,2,2) [4×23 = 32 vertices]
 (1,1,1,3) [4×24 = 64 vertices]

Images

Symmetry constructions 

There are three different symmetry constructions of this polytope. The lowest  construction can be doubled into  by adding a mirror that maps the bifurcating nodes onto each other.  can be mapped up to  symmetry by adding two mirror that map all three end nodes together.

The vertex figure is a triangular prism, containing two cubes and three cuboctahedra.

Alternate names
 Rectified 24-cell, Cantellated 16-cell (Norman Johnson)
 Rectified icositetrachoron (Acronym rico) (George Olshevsky, Jonathan Bowers)
 Cantellated hexadecachoron
 Disicositetrachoron
 Amboicositetrachoron (Neil Sloane & John Horton Conway)

Related polytopes 
The convex hull of the rectified 24-cell and its dual (assuming that they are congruent) is a nonuniform polychoron composed of 192 cells: 48 cubes, 144 square antiprisms, and 192 vertices. Its vertex figure is a triangular bifrustum.

Related uniform polytopes 

The rectified 24-cell can also be derived as a cantellated 16-cell:

Citations

References 
 T. Gosset: On the Regular and Semi-Regular Figures in Space of n Dimensions, Messenger of Mathematics, Macmillan, 1900
 
 John H. Conway, Heidi Burgiel, Chaim Goodman-Strass, The Symmetries of Things 2008,  (Chapter 26. pp. 409: Hemicubes: 1n1)
 Norman Johnson Uniform Polytopes, Manuscript (1991)
 N.W. Johnson: The Theory of Uniform Polytopes and Honeycombs, Ph.D. (1966)
 
 
 
 

4-polytopes